The 1st Cossack Cavalry Division was a Russian Cossack division of the German Army that served during World War II. It was created on the Eastern Front mostly out of Don Cossacks already serving in the Wehrmacht, those who escaped from the advancing Red Army and Soviet POWs. In 1944, the division was transferred to the Waffen SS, becoming part of the XV SS Cossack Cavalry Corps, established in February 1945. At the end of the war, the unit ceased to exist.

It was one of two cossack cavalry divisions, the other being the 2nd Cossack Cavalry Division.

Origin 
Adolf Hitler authorised the formation of the division on 6 April 1943, ordering that all Cossacks serving in the Wehrmacht to be concentrated into the division.

Formation and training 
The division was and trained at Mielau (Mława) in the spring-summer of 1943. The Cossacks brought their wives and children with them, forcing the Germans to establish another camp to house the dependents. 

The division was formed starting 4 August 1943 by merging the Cossack regiments Platow and von Jungschulz under the command of the Reiterverband Pannwitz, all of which existed since 1942. To these further new regiments were added. Some of the other units brought in were the Cossack Reconnaissance Battalion led by the Don Cossack Nikolai Nazarenko; the Cossack Detachment 600 led by Ivan Kononov, also a Don Cossack; and a force of Terek Cossacks led by ataman Nikolai Kulakkov of the Terek Host.

Composition 
Many of the German officers were Baltic German émigrés who possessed the necessary knowledge of Russian. 

However, owing to a shortage of officers with the necessary Russian language skills, the Wehrmacht was forced to relax its policy against accepting émigré officers, and a number of Cossack émigré officers living in Yugoslavia, France, Germany and the Protectorate of Bohemia and Moravia (modern Czechia) were recruited into the division. Other officers were the sons of Cossack émigrés who had served in the armies of France, Yugoslavia and Bulgaria before the war. A disproportionate number of the German officers were cavalrymen, and Austrians were over-represented as it was felt that Austrians were more "tactful" in dealing with Slavs than the Prussians.

Anti-Partisan operations 
Initially organized to fight the Red Army in Southern Russia, the division was deployed to the puppet Independent State of Croatia, where they were placed under the command of the Second Panzer Army and were used to protect the railroad line from Austria through Zagreb to Belgrade. Some units were also used to fight partisans.

The division's first fighting engagement was on 12 October 1943, when it was dispatched against Yugoslav partisans in the Fruška Gora Mountains. In the operation the Cossacks, aided by 15 tanks and one armored car, captured the village of Beocin, the location of a partisan HQ. During that operation many villages were burned, including a monastery on Fruška Gora, and around 300 innocent Serbian villagers were killed. Subsequently, the unit was used to protect the Zagreb-Belgrade railroad and the Sava Valley. Several regiments of the division took part in security warfare (Bandenbekämpfung) and guarded the Sarajevo railroad. As part of a wide security sweep, Napfkuchen, the Cossack division was transferred to Croatia, where it fought against partisans and Chetniks in 1944.

While in Croatia the division quickly established a reputation for undisciplined and ruthless behavior, not only towards the partisans but also the civilian population, prompting Croatian authorities to complain to the Germans and finally to Adolf Hitler personally. Besides raping women, killing people and plundering and burning towns suspected of harboring partisans and their supporters, the division used telegraph poles along the railroad tracks for mass hangings as a warning to the partisans and others. Although the behavior of the Cossacks was not as ruthless as portrayed by Partisan propaganda, nevertheless during its first two months of deployment in Croatia, special divisional courts-martial imposed at least 20 death sentences in each of the four regiments for related crimes.

The Cossacks' first engagement against the Red Army occurred in December 1944 near Pitomača. The fighting resulted in Soviet withdrawal from the area.

Transfer to Waffen-SS 
In December 1944 the 1st Cossack Division was transferred to the Waffen-SS and reorganized by the SS Führungshauptamt until 30 April 1945. Together with a 2nd Cossack Division it became part of the newly formed XV SS Cossack Cavalry Corps.

Aftermath 
At the end of the war Cossacks of the division retreated into Austria and surrendered to British troops. They were promised safety by the British but were subsequently forcibly transferred to the USSR. The majority of those, who did not manage to escape, went into the labour camps of the Gulag. The German and Cossack leadership were tried, sentenced to death and executed in Moscow in early 1947. The remaining officers and other ranks who survived the labour camps were released after Stalin's death in 1953.

Commanders 
Lt. Gen. Helmuth von Pannwitz (Sep 1943 – Feb 1945) 
Col. Hans-Joachim von Schultz, Chief of Staff
Col. von Baath (Feb – ? 1945)
Col. Alexander von Boesse (1945)
Col. Konstantin Wagner (1945).

Order of battle
In 1944 the division was composed of the following units:

1st Cossack Cavalry Brigade Don
1st (Don) Cossack Cavalry Regiment
2nd (Ural) Cossack Cavalry Regiment
3rd (Sswodno) Cossack Cavalry Regiment
Cossack Horse Artillery Regiment Don

2nd Cossack Cavalry Brigade 
4th (Kuban) Cossack Cavalry Regiment
5th (Don) Cossack Cavalry Regiment
6th (Terek) Cossack Cavalry Regiment
Cossack Horse Artillery Regiment Kuban

Divisional units
55th Reconnaissance Battalion
55th (Kuban) Cossack Horse Artillery Regiment
1st Cossack Engineer Battalion
55th Cossack Engineer Battalion
1st Signal Battalion

See also
List of German divisions in World War II
List of Waffen-SS divisions
List of SS personnel

References

Footnotes

Bibliography

Further reading
 François de Lannoy. Pannwitz Cossacks: Les Cosaques de Pannwitz 1942 - 1945

Cavalry divisions of the Waffen-SS
Foreign volunteer units of the Waffen-SS
Cossack military units and formations
Military units and formations established in 1943
Military units and formations disestablished in 1945
Military units and formations of Germany in Yugoslavia in World War II
Russian collaborators with Nazi Germany